Trailing bellflower is a common name for several ornamental plants in the bellflower family and may refer to:

Campanula poscharskyana
Cyananthus lobatus